This is a list of the busiest railway stations in Great Britain on the National Rail network for the 1 April 2020 to 31 March 2021 financial year. The dataset records patterns of mobility during the first year of the COVID-19 pandemic in the United Kingdom with significantly reduced levels of mobility compared with the previous year. Extended periods of significantly reduced commuting and long distance travel caused many major stations to drop in the ranking. During 2020–21 there were 388 million passenger journeys on the network, compared to 1,739 million in 2019–20. Stratford Regional in London was the busiest station during the year, replacing London Waterloo which had been top of the ranking for 16 years.

Methodology
The figures are collected by the Office of Rail and Road, and are estimates based on ticket usage data use of an Origin Destination Matrix, a comprehensive matrix of rail flows between stations throughout Great Britain in the financial year of 2020–21. The data count entries and exits at any station. Note that the data covers mainland Great Britain and surrounding small islands (such as the Isle of Wight), not the United Kingdom, and so exclude tickets within Northern Ireland and Eurostar. There are various further limits to the data due to the variety of ticketing options available on rail services within the UK; these are outlined in full in the report on the data. Only tickets sold for National Rail services are included; some stations may also be served by underground metro or urban light rail networks. Stations serving solely the London Underground, light rail, special tours or heritage railways are therefore excluded. Data for 2020–21 was published on 25 November 2021.

All stations
Only stations with annual entries and exits above 2 million passengers are shown. There were 5 stations with more than 10 million entries and exits, compared to 43 stations the previous year.

Below this, station usage was as follows, per 2020-21 ridership data: 
 90 had reported between 1–2 million passengers
 171 had reported between 500,001–1 million passengers
 333 had reported between 200,001–500,000 passengers
 298 had reported between 100,001–200,000 passengers
 360 had reported between 50,001–100,000 passengers
 713 had reported between 10,001–50,000 passengers
 371 had reported between 1,001–10,000 passengers
 120 had reported between 101–1,000 passengers
 59 stations reported fewer than 100 passengers.

London terminal

This is a list of the busiest stations in the "London terminals" station group.

Other London stations

This is a list of the 20 busiest stations in Greater London, excluding those listed above under the London termini.

Stations outside London

This is a list of the 20 busiest stations in Great Britain outside London.

See also
List of busiest railway stations in Great Britain for 2021–22 data
List of busiest railway stations in Great Britain (2019–20)
List of busiest London Underground stations (2020)
List of busiest railway stations in Europe
List of busiest railway stations in North America
List of busiest railway stations in West Yorkshire

Notes

References

External links
Station usage - Main page

 
Busiest railway stations in Great Britain